Frederick Patrick Reed (May 12, 1870 – February 7, 1942) was an American football coach and medical doctor.

Reed was born in Weeping Water, Nebraska, in 1870. His father, William H. Reed, moved in 1858 to Nebraska, served as a state legislator, and platted the town of Weeping Water. The younger Reed attended Dartmouth College, graduating in 1892.

After graduating from Dartmouth, Reed served as the first head football coach at Doane College in Crete, Nebraska, holding that position for the 1892 season.  His coaching record at Doane was 1–1. The team's loss was to the University of Illinois in a game played in Omaha.

In 1899, Reed received a Doctor of Medicine degree from the University Medical College in Kansas City, Missouri. He worked as a medical doctor in Colorado for several years. By 1920, he had moved to San Francisco, later settling in Stockton, California. He died in 1942 in San Joaquin County, California.

Head coaching record

References

1870 births
1942 deaths
Doane Tigers football coaches
Dartmouth College alumni
People from Cass County, Nebraska